The Bravery Council of Australia Meeting 80 Honours List was announced by the Governor General of Australia, the then Quentin Bryce, AC, CVO, on 24 March 2014.

Awards were announced for 
the Star of Courage,
the Bravery Medal,
Commendation for Brave Conduct and
Group Bravery Citation.

† indicates an award given posthumously.

Star of Courage (SC)

Andrew MacDONALD, New South Wales

Bravery Medal (BM)

 Mrs Leanne Gayle BARBER, New South Wales
 Senior Constable Darryl Roderick CAMPBELL, Queensland Police
 Detective Inspector Darren John CLOAKE New South Wales Police
 Rowan Anthony CUTBUSH, New South Wales 
 John Edward DAVIES, Victoria
 William Thomas DENNY, South Australia
 Bradley David DRAPER, Queensland
 Damian Simon HALL, Victoria
 Rodney Charles HOWARD, New South Wales
 Charlton William KABLE † , New South Wales
 Mark John McNICOL, New South Wales
 Daniel Martin RACE, Western Australia 
 David RADCLIFFE, Queensland
 Daniel REBBECHI, Western Australia

Commendation for Brave Conduct

 Mrs Connie Teresa BORG, Victoria
 Senior Sergeant David George BRAY, Tasmania Police
 Stephen Francis CORCORAN, Queensland
 James Michael DINGLE, Queensland
 Sergeant John Paul GOMES, New South Wales Police
 Corporal Kim Elizabeth GRAY, Australian Army
 Graham Duncan HARTWIG, Queensland
 Rodney Duncan HARTWIG, Queensland
 Dean Edward HUDSON, New South Wales
 Robert Stanley KEARNEY, South Australia
 Miss Elise Nicole LAVERS, South Australia
 Senior Constable Drew Alexander LEWIS, Queensland Police
 Thomas Peter McPEAKE, South Australia
 Miss Terry McPHERSON, Queensland
 Mandeep NAGRA, Queensland
 Detective Leading Senior Constable Marc Anthony NEWTON, Victoria Police
 Zachary John O'LEARY-BARLOW, Western Australia
 Glen OLERENSHAW, New South Wales
 Duncan James ROGERS, Victoria
 Corporal Scott Robert RUEHLAND, Australian Army
 Mrs Sharon Maree VAUGHAN, Queensland
 Brett Leslie WILLIAMS, Queensland

Group Bravery Citation
Awardees are two people who took action following a collision between two heavy vehicles, at Myalup, Western Australia on 11 December 2012. 
 Brian Ugo DELL'AGOSTINO, Western Australia
 Mrs Lynette Amy GILBERT, Western Australia
 
Awardees are several people who rescued two women from being set alight at Daleys Point, New South Wales on 5 April 2013. 
Jarrod Carl LYMBURNER, Queensland
Jordon REMFREY, Queensland
 
Awardees are several people who rescued a boy who fell over a waterfall at Devils Thumb, near  Mossman, Queensland on 17 August 2008. 
 Sam GIBSON, Queensland
 Matthew Aaron WERNER, (State not disclosed)

Awardees are members from the Goolwa Country Fire Service who rescued a woman trapped in floodwater at Finniss, South Australia on 27 July 2012. 
 Andrew John GABELL, South Australia
 Cory John JOHNSON, South Australia
 Thomas Peter McPEAKE, South Australia
 Kenneth Roger SMIRKE, South Australia
 Paul John THURKLE, South Australia
 Amos Bradley ZADOW, South Australia

Awardees are the Australian Defence Force helicopter crew, from Warhorse 104, involved in the rescue of several people trapped in floodwaters at Bundaberg, Queensland on 28 January 2013. 
 Corporal Kim Elizabeth GRAY, Australian Army
 Captain Robert William JONES, Australian Army
 Corporal Matthew Paul KENNEDY, Australian Army
 Captain Dion PALMER, Australian Army 
 
Awardees are the Australian Defence Force helicopter crew, from Warhorse 214, involved in the rescue of several people trapped in floodwaters at Bundaberg, Queensland on 28 January 2013 
 Captain Rex David CURTIS, Australian Army
 Corporal Brett Arthur HOY, Australian Army
 Captain David Dennis REES, Australian Army
 Corporal Scott Robert RUEHLAND, Australian Army
 
Awardees are members of the Australian Defence Force and Customs and Border Protection personnel who were involved in the rescue of forty-one people when a suspected illegal entry vessel impacted the rocks at Rocky Point, Christmas Island on 15 December 2010. 
 Daniel Ronald BLACKBURN, Queensland
 Michael Terence BURGESS, Western Australia
 Troy Adam DANIELS, Queensland
 Leading Seaman Mitchell Scott DAVIDSON, Royal Australian Navy
 Lieutenant Jeremy Michel EVAIN, Royal Australian Navy
 Graham John GOURLAY, Queensland
 Private Dane Robert HEINEMANN, Australian Army
 Leading Seaman Adam Daniel HUBBARD, Royal Australian Navy
 Paul Michael JARDINE, Queensland 
 Chief Petty Officer Raymond Charles MANLEY, Royal Australian Navy
 Brett Patrick MARMONT, New South Wales 
 Private Kale Raymond MORRISSEY, Australian Army
 Leading Seaman Shannon MUNDY-CASTLE, Royal Australian Navy
 Able Seaman Cory James ROBERTS, Royal Australian Navy
 Leigh RULE, South Australia
 Able Seaman Jake Andrew SMITH, Royal Australian Navy
 Private Samuel Kurt WILLIAMSON-ROBERTSON, Australian Army
 
Awardees are several police officers who took actions as bushfires threatened residents in Heathcote, New South Wales on 26 December 2001. 
 Bernard James DOYLE, New South Wales
 Senior Constable Mathew John DREVERMAN, New South Wales Police
 Senior Constable Kelvin Roy MADDALENA, New South Wales Police
 Senior Constable Jamie David OLIVER, New South Wales Police
 Sergeant Andrew Paul SETTER, New South Wales Police
 Sergeant Christopher YORK, New South Wales Police
 
Awardees are several people who assisted during the rescue of several children who were swept out to sea at Patonga Beach, New South Wales on 12 January 2013. 
 James BILLINGTON, New South Wales
 Chadd William HOFNER, New South Wales
 Liam John PETTIT, New South Wales
 Clint PILLING, New South Wales
 
Awardee is a member of Queensland Fire and Rescue Service who conducted rescue operations in Toowoomba during the Queensland Floods in January 2011 
 David Robert Crighton, Queensland Fire and Rescue Service

References

Orders, decorations, and medals of Australia
2013 awards